A weapon of mass destruction Civil Support Team (WMD-CST or CST) supports civil authorities in the event of the use, or threatened use, of a weapon of mass destruction. CSTs are federally funded units established under Presidential Decision Directive 39. There are 57 National Guard Teams and one Army Reserve full-time team: one in every U.S. state, Washington, D.C., Puerto Rico, Germany, Guam, and the US Virgin Islands with an additional team each in California, Florida, and New York.

Units

1st CST	MA
2nd CST NY
3rd CST	PA
4th CST	GA
5th CST	IL
6th CST TX
 7th CST MO
8th CST	CO
9th CST	CA
10th CST	WA
11th CST ME
12th CST	NH
13th CST	RI
14th CST	CT
15th CST VT

21st CST	NJ
22nd CST	PR
23rd CST	VI
24th CST	NY
31st CST DE
32nd CST MD
33rd CST DC
34th CST VA
35th CST	WV

41st CST	KY
42nd CST NC
43rd CST	SC
44th CST FL
45th CST	TN
46th CST	AL
47th CST	MS
48th CST	FL
51st CST MI
52nd CST	OH
53rd CST	IN
54th CST       WI
55th CST	MN

 61st CST AR
62nd CST LA
63rd CST  OK
64th CST	NM
71st CST	IA
72nd CST	NE
73rd CST	KS

81st CST	ND
82nd CST	SD
83rd CST MT
84th CST	WY
85th CST	UT
91st CST	AZ
92nd CST	NV
93rd CST	HI
94th CST	GU
95th CST	CA
101st CST	ID
102nd CST	OR
103rd CST	AK
773rd CST      Kaiserslautern, Germany (Army Reserves team)

Mission
The mission of the WMD-CST is to support civil authorities at the direction of the Governor, at domestic CBRN incident sites by identifying CBRN agents/substances, assessing current and projected consequences, advising on response measures, and assisting with requests for additional support. In the National Defense Authorization Act (NDAA), Fiscal Year (FY) 2007, Congress expanded the operational incidents a WMD-CST could be used to include the intentional or unintentional release of CBRN and natural or man-made disasters in the United States that result, or could result, in the catastrophic loss of life or property.

Overview
The WMD-CSTs are National Guard units designed to provide a specialized capability to respond to a chemical, biological, radiological or nuclear (CBRN) incident primarily in a Title 32 operational status within the United States, the District of Columbia, its territories and possessions, as established by 10 USC §12310. Congress, the President, and DoD recognized that the WMD-CSTs, {responding under the authority of the Governor (Only for the National Guard)}, provide significant capabilities to assist local and state agencies that may be overwhelmed by a large-scale terrorist attack or where specific technical capabilities to identify CBRN materials are required. In October 1998, Congress authorized and funded the fielding of the first 10 WMD-CSTs. With this fielding began the development and evolution of new capabilities and concepts to ensure that DoD could support evolving interagency response plans. Since 1998, Congress has authorized and funded the fielding of WMD-CSTs in the remaining States and territories.

The WMD-CST consists of 22 National Guard Soldiers and Airmen, in Full-Time duty status; also known as Active Guard/Reserve (AGR) status. The unit consists of six (6) sections: command, operations, administration/logistics, medical/analytical, communications, and survey. The WMD-CST is required to maintain a level of readiness that will allow for a rapid response within established timelines. The unit is specially trained and equipped to assist local, tribal, state, and Federal emergency response organizations with state of the art equipment. They also have a technical and analytical reachback capability to other experts who may assist the local response.

The certified WMD-CSTs provide unique capabilities, expertise, and technologies to assist the governors in preparing for and responding to a CBRN situation. These WMD-CSTs are available 24 hours a day, 7 days a week for rapid deployment for response operations. The WMD-CST complements and enhances local and State capabilities. In order to ensure that the WMD-CSTs are capable of a sustainable, rapid response in support of a validated request for assistance, the following response management plan outlines a standardized approach to provide WMD-CST support anywhere in the United States. The WMD-CST is manned, trained, and equipped to conduct continuous operations for a minimum of 72 hours using organic table of distribution and allowances (TDA) assets. If extended operations, past 72 hours are required, additional WMD-CSTs will be alerted to provide augmentation or relief. Codified as the Response Management Plan (RMP), this document ensures that a designated number of WMD-CSTs are always ready to respond to a national need, or to fill a request of a State without an available WMD-CST. A primary planning assumption is that each JFHQ-State is best informed to create contingency plans for WMD-CST coverage within its jurisdiction. Therefore, this plan is intended to be activated only when a specific support request is received at the NGB Joint Coordination Center (JoCC). NGB initiated operational support requests will be the exception. 
WMD-CSTs support over 2500 events annually conducting counter WMD activities.

References

National Guard (United States)
Military units and formations of the United States Army Reserve